John Tunney may refer to:

 John Tunney (naturalist) (1870–1929), Australian naturalist
 John V. Tunney (1934–2018), United States politician
 Jack Tunney (John Tunney Jr., 1935–2004), wrestling promoter